Eucosmomorpha is a genus of moths belonging to the subfamily Olethreutinae of the family Tortricidae.

Species
Eucosmomorpha albersana (Hubner, [1811-1813])
Eucosmomorpha figurana (Kuznetzov, 1997)
Eucosmomorpha multicolor Kuznetzov, 1964
Eucosmomorpha nearctica Miller, 2002

See also
List of Tortricidae genera

References

External links
tortricidae.com

Enarmoniini
Tortricidae genera